Chinese Hero: Tales of the Blood Sword is a wuxia manhua series created by Hong Kong artist Ma Wing-shing. It is also referred to as Blood Sword, Blood Sword Dynasty, A Chinese Hero: Tales of the Blood Sword and A Man Called Hero.

Background
The artwork and drawing style of Chinese Hero is responsible for the modern characteristics of manhua. It was a breakthrough in terms of using high levels of details, realistic style, clear cut action scenes and skillful use of color in combination with an engrossing plot. The manhua turned the artist Ma Wing-shing from rags to riches. Ma became the most popular manhua artist in Hong Kong at that time. The story was an immediate hit selling 45,000 copies when first released. At the peak of its popularity, sales hit peaks of 200,000 copies. It is famous for having characters that are physically imperfect, such as missing an eye or limb for the sake to express the realism that real life people are not perfect.

Plot 
The plot is set in China and America in the early 20th century. Hua Yingxiong (literally "Chinese Hero") is a young swordsman whose family was murdered by a foreign-backed tycoon coveting his family heirloom, the Blood Sword. After taking revenge on the foreigners who killed his family, Hua Yingxiong flees to America to start a new but embittered life as a miner. Throughout his adventures in America, he meets new friends such as Guipu (Ghost Servant) and Jinlong (Gold Dragon), and learns new skills and becomes a powerful swordsman. However, he also runs into trouble with the ruthless Black Dragon Gang and a Japanese ninja group. As he gets caught up in the power struggles, Hua Yingxiong finds himself up against gang wars, murder, treachery and racial discrimination in America.

Following a fight against the Black Dragon Gang and the ninjas, Hua Yingxiong and his wife Jieyu decide to leave America with their newborn twins and return to China. During the voyage, Jieyu is murdered by Black Dragon gangsters while the twins are thrown overboard. In anger, Hua Yingxiong heads back to America to confront the Black Dragon Gang. He fails in his attempt to kill the gang leader but is saved by an elderly swordsman, Sword Saint. Before his death, Sword Saint entrusts the inn in Chinatown to Hua Yingxiong's care and makes him promise never to get involved in any conflict again.

Several years later, Hua Yingxiong has grown old. One day, a mysterious teenager visits the inn and he turns out to be Hua Yingxiong's son, Hua Jianxiong, who has survived and grown up in China. Hua Yingxiong also learns from a fortune teller that he is destined to lead a life of loneliness because misfortune will befall everyone close to him. In the final showdown, he defeats a Japanese swordsman in a duel on top of the Statue of Liberty.

Publication history

Original release
Chinese Hero was first published in Golden Daily in 1980 and was a supplement to Wong Yuk-long's Drunken Master. It then later became its own separate manhua. The first issue of the Chinese Hero periodical was published in 1982.

Jademan comic releases
In late 1988, Jademan Comics started publishing Chinese Hero in English under the title The Blood Sword, which was criticised for poor translation. Jademan later published a second series titled Blood Sword Dynasty which followed the adventures of the protagonist Wah Ying-hung's son, Wah Kim-hung. Ma Wing-shing left Jademan by 1989.

The Chinese manhua Blood Sword Dynasty is part of the same series as Chinese Hero and not a spin-off. Despite its popularity, the series was canceled in 1995.

DrMaster releases
In October 2006, publishers DrMaster announced that they were planning to release a new English translation of Chinese Hero. These new releases included an all new English translation as well as new digital re-coloration. The re-release started from the beginning of the second series, with the plot alteration of Hero's parents being murdered by a "rival martial arts clan" instead of Westerners in the original version, due to the first series use of anti-Western sentiments. The reprints at the point of volume 8 do not extend beyond the original plot of the original Jademan comics.

Collections
The collections are:

 Chinese Hero:
 Tales of the Blood Sword volume 1 (April 2007, 260 pages)
 Tales of the Blood Sword volume 2 (September 2007, 260 pages)
 Tales of the Blood Sword volume 3 (August 2007, 280 pages)
 Tales of the Blood Sword volume 4 (November 2007, 280 pages)
 Tales of the Blood Sword volume 5 (February 2008, 240 pages)
 Tales of the Blood Sword volume 6 (May 2008, 224 pages)
 Tales of the Blood Sword volume 7 (August 2008, 224 pages)
 Tales of the Blood Sword volume 8 (November 2008, 224 pages)

Adaptations

Film
Ekin Cheng starred in a 1999 Hong Kong film titled A Man Called Hero directed by Andrew Lau. Although the plot differed largely from the original story, the film was popular and became the highest grossing Hong Kong film up to that time.

Television
In 1990 Hong Kong's ATV produced and aired a 25 episodes television series based on the manhua. It was titled The Blood Sword and starred Kenny Ho, Law Chung-wah, Veronica Yip, Yeung Chak-lam, Esther Kwan, Eric Wan. A 20 episodes long prequel, The Blood Sword 2, was released a year later, with most of the cast members in the first season reprising their roles.

In 2005 Taiwanese producer Yang Peipei released a 40 episodes television series based on the manhua. It was titled The Legend of Hero and starred Peter Ho, Ady An, Lan Chenglong, Qin Lan, Zheng Guolin, Chen Guanlin, Liu Weihua, Li Li-chun, Feng Shaofeng in the leading roles.

Video game
A video game based on the manhua was produced by Acebrock. The game was initially scheduled to be released in both Chinese and English on the PC platform. Although the game shared the same English title as the film, it remained faithful to the original story as opposed to the changes introduced in the film. As of 2007, Acebrock fell through and the game existed in either scrap or beta form only.

References

Hong Kong comics titles
Wuxia comics
1980 comics debuts
Video games developed in Hong Kong